Howitt may refer to:

Surname
Notable people with the surname Howitt include:

Alfred Howitt (politician) (1879–1954), English medical doctor and politician
Alfred William Howitt (1830–1908), Australian anthropologist and naturalist
Anna Mary Howitt (1824–1884), English painter, writer and feminist
Bobby Howitt (1925–2005), Scottish footballer
Dann Howitt (born 1964), American baseball player
Dave Howitt (born 1952), English footballer
David Howitt (entrepreneur) (born 1968), American business consultant
Dennis Howitt, British psychologist
Godfrey Howitt (1800–1863), English-born Australian botanist and doctor
Hugh Howitt, English pub landlord
Mary Howitt (1799–1888), English poet and author
Peter Howitt (born 1957), English actor and film director
Peter Howitt (set decorator) (born 1928), English set decorator
Peter Howitt (economist) (born 1946), Canadian economist
Richard Howitt (disambiguation), multiple people
Samuel Howitt (1765–1822), English artist
Steve Howitt, American politician
Thomas Cecil Howitt (1889–1968), English architect
William Howitt (1792–1879), English author

Other uses
 Howitt, Queensland, a locality in the Shire of Carpentaria, Queensland, Australia

See also
Howatt (surname)
Hiwatt, British company
Howat (surname)
Howittia, plant genus